The 1972 New York Mets season was the 11th regular season for the Mets, who played home games at Shea Stadium. Led by manager Yogi Berra, the team had an 83–73 record and finished in third place in the National League's Eastern Division.

Offseason

Death of Gil Hodges 
On April 2, 1972, Gil Hodges and his coaches Rube Walker, Joe Pignatano and Eddie Yost, were in West Palm Beach, Florida. As they were returning to their motel after a round of golf, Hodges suddenly collapsed, falling backward and cracking his head open. Hodges was dead of a heart attack, two days short of his forty-eighth birthday. The Mets wore a black-armband on the left sleeves of their uniform jerseys during the 1972 season in honor of Hodges.

A new man in charge 
On April 6, the Mets announced their new manager, Yogi Berra. The announcement of Berra's appointment was accompanied by another; the Mets had traded outfielder Ken Singleton, infielder Tim Foli, and first baseman-outfielder Mike Jorgensen to the Montreal Expos for hard-hitting star outfielder Rusty Staub. In Staub, the Mets had  a bona fide major league hitter, a .311-hitting, 97-RBI man the year before with Montreal. Also joining the club this year was John Milner, a left-handed, power-hitting, first baseman-outfielder.

Notable transactions 
 December 10, 1971: Nolan Ryan, Frank Estrada, Don Rose, and Leroy Stanton were traded by the Mets to the California Angels for Jim Fregosi.

Regular season

Season summary

"Say Hey" is back in New York 
On May 11, the Mets added another "new" face to the team. In a move seasoned with sentiment more than anything else, they acquired Willie Mays from the San Francisco Giants for pitcher Charlie Williams and cash.

The acquisition of Mays had been a longtime dream of that old New York Giants fan, Mrs. Joan Payson. With Willie no longer pulling the weight of his large contract, Giants owner Horace Stoneham made him available, and Mrs. Payson could not resist.

He was, of course, no longer the fabled Willie Mays, the greatest player since Joe DiMaggio, and some said, maybe the greatest ever, which gave him value as a drawing card. He was 41 years old, slowed down considerably in the field and at the plate, no longer possessing that cannon of an arm. He was, in truth, something of a liability now in center and it was more prudent to play him at first base.

A sizzling start, then they fizzled 
The club got off to a sizzling start in 1972, playing better than .700 ball through early June, peaking at 25-7 (.781) on May 21, leading the Pirates by 6 games. But soon after, a series of disabling injuries to Staub, Bud Harrelson, Jerry Grote, and Cleon Jones brought the team up short and dropped them into their third consecutive third-place finish, 13.5 behind Pittsburgh.

Despite a promising start, the season ending on a highly disappointing note. Jim Fregosi, who suffered a broken thumb in spring training, never got on track and continued the third-base jinx with a .232 batting average. Ken Boswell hit just .211 and the club was ready to give up on him. John Milner flashed some power with 17 homers but batted only .238. Tommie Agee, unhappy at being displaced in center by Mays now and then, batted .227, and the club already had his ticket punched. Staub, limited to just 66 games because of a broken hand, hit .293 and was sorely missed. Mays batted a respectable .267, but his fielding deficiencies were now glaring.

Tom Seaver was 21–12, Jim McAndrew 11–8, Jerry Koosman 11–12, while Rookie of the Year Jon Matlack was 15–10. Gary Gentry slumped to 7–10, leaving his employers disenchanted. Tug McGraw continued as the bullpen ace, with 8 wins and 27 saves.

Witnessing history 
On September 30, Matlack made the trivia lists when he served up a double to Pittsburgh legend Roberto Clemente. It was the Pirate great's 3,000th and last big-league hit. On New Year's Eve, Clemente lost his life when the plane on which he was taking food and medical supplies to earthquake-smashed Managua, Nicaragua, crashed into the ocean soon after taking off from San Juan, Puerto Rico.

Season standings

Record vs. opponents

Opening Day starters 
 Tommie Agee
 Ken Boswell
 Jim Fregosi
 Jerry Grote
 Bud Harrelson
 Cleon Jones
 Ed Kranepool
 Tom Seaver
 Rusty Staub

Notable transactions 
 April 5, 1972: Ken Singleton, Mike Jorgensen, and Tim Foli were traded by the New York Mets to the Montreal Expos for Rusty Staub.
 May 11, 1972: Charlie Williams and $50,000 were traded by the Mets to the San Francisco Giants for Willie Mays.

Roster

Player stats

Batting

Starters by position 
Note: Pos = Position; G = Games played; AB = At bats; H = Hits; Avg. = Batting average; HR = Home runs; RBI = Runs batted in

Other batters 
Note: G = Games played; AB = At bats; H = Hits; Avg. = Batting average; HR = Home runs; RBI = Runs batted in

Pitching

Starting pitchers 
Note: G = Games pitched; IP = Innings pitched; W = Wins; L = Losses; ERA = Earned run average; SO = Strikeouts

Other pitchers 
Note: G = Games pitched; IP = Innings pitched; W = Wins; L = Losses; ERA = Earned run average; SO = Strikeouts

Relief pitchers 
Note: G = Games pitched; Innings pitched; W = Wins; L = Losses; SV = Saves; ERA = Earned run average; SO = Strikeouts

Awards and honors

All-Stars 
1972 Major League Baseball All-Star Game
 Willie Mays, starting center fielder
 Tug McGraw, reserve
 Tom Seaver, reserve

Farm system 

LEAGUE CHAMPIONS: Tidewater

Notes

References 
1972 New York Mets at Baseball Reference
1972 New York Mets team page at www.baseball-almanac.com

New York Mets seasons
New York Mets season
1972 in sports in New York City
1970s in Queens